Me Oh My, How the Time Does Fly: A John Hartford Anthology is a compilation album by American musician John Hartford, released on LP and cassette in 1987 (see 1987 in music).  It was reissued and remastered on CD in 1994 featuring the track listing below.

Track listing 
All songs by John Hartford unless otherwise noted.
 "Skippin' in the Mississippi Dew" – 2:57
 "The Julia Belle Swain" – 4:47
 "Natchez Whistle" – 3:00
 "I Would Not Be Here" – 1:51
 "Miss Ferris" – 6:58
 "Bear Creek Hop" – 1:54
 "Cukoo's Nest" (Hartford, Traditional) – 3:14
 "Boogie" – 2:29
 "Gum Tree Canoe" (S. S. Steele) – 4:05
 "Slumberin' on the Cumberland" (Hartford, Benny Martin) – 4:44
 "Gentle on My Mind" – 4:34
 "In Tall Buildings" – 3:24
 "Nobody Eats at Linebaugh's Anymore" – 6:21
 "On Christmas Eve" – 3:13
 "Way Down the River Road" – 2:16
 "Let Him Go on, Mama" – 3:47
 "(Good Old Electric) Washing Machine (Circa. 1943)" – 2:05
 "I'm Still Here" – 3:08

Personnel 
 John Hartford – vocals, banjo, fiddle, guitar
 David Briggs – piano
 Curtis Burch – dobro
 Jerry Douglas – dobro
 Jack Clement – dobro, guitar, ukulele
 Sam Bush – mandolin, guitar, vocals
 Pat Burton – guitar
 Jim Colvard – guitar
 John Cowan – bass, vocals
 Doug Dillard – banjo
 Rodney Dillard – guitar
 Dalton Dillingham – bowed bass
 Buddy Emmons – steel guitar, dobro
 Mark Howard – guitar
 Courtney Johnson – banjo
 Roy Huskey, Jr. – bass
 Larrie Londin – drums
 Kenny Malone – drums, percussion
 Benny Martin – violin, ukulele, vocals
 Mark O'Connor – mandolin, guitar
 Marty Stuart – mandolin
 Hargus "Pig" Robbins – piano
 Henry Strzelecki – bass
 Tommy Hannum – vocals
 Billy Ray Reynolds – vocals
 Mac Wiseman – vocals
 Rick Schulman – vocals
 Jeannie Seely– vocals
 Lisa Silver – vocals
 Diane Tidwell – vocals

Production notes 
 John Hartford – producer, arranger
 Jack Clement – producer
 Sam Bush – producer
 Michael Melford – producer
 Richard Adler – engineer
 Jack Grochmal – engineer
 Claude Hill – engineer
 Ernie Winfrey – engineer
 Dolores Wilber – art direction
 Jim McGuire – photography
 J. Seymour Guenther – liner notes

References 

John Hartford albums
1987 compilation albums